, 3% of new cars sold in Taiwan were electric.
, the Tesla Model 3 was the best-selling electric car in Taiwan.

Charging stations
, there were 1,399 charging station locations with 4,380 charging ports in Taiwan.

Manufacturing
Taiwan has been proposed as a hub for electric vehicle manufacturing.

By region

New Taipei
, there were 542 public charging station ports in New Taipei City.

Taichung
, there were 685 public charging station ports in Taichung.

Taipei
, there were 994 public charging station ports in Taipei.

References

Taiwan
Road transportation in Taiwan